Leopoldo Aquino "Lee" Quintas Jr. (born July 5, 1964) is a retired lieutenant general in the United States Army, who last served as the deputy commanding general and chief of staff of United States Army Forces Command (FORSCOM).

Quintas was born in Connecticut and attended Montville High School, graduating in 1982. His father, Leopoldo "Leo" Quintas Sr. was born in the Philippines and was a United States Coast Guard veteran of the Vietnam War. Quintas Jr. is a graduate of United States Military Academy and was commissioned in 1986.

Awards and decorations

References

1964 births
United States Army personnel of the Gulf War
United States Army personnel of the Iraq War
United States Army personnel of the War in Afghanistan (2001–2021)
Living people
Naval War College alumni
Recipients of the Defense Superior Service Medal
Recipients of the Legion of Merit
Rensselaer Polytechnic Institute alumni
United States Army Command and General Staff College alumni
United States Military Academy alumni